The town of San José Huipana is in the north of the Mexican state of Michoacán. 
The population is 3,300.

The name of Huipana means "place wolves cave or coyote burrow" in the Purépecha language.

External links
http://es-la.facebook.com/people/San-Jose-Huipana-Michoacan/100001876061280 San José Huipana, Facebook.

Populated places in Michoacán